ALF: The Animated Series (also known as ALF on Melmac) is a 30-minute Saturday morning animated series that aired on NBC for 26 episodes from September 26, 1987, to January 7, 1989.

ALF: The Animated Series was a prequel and animated spinoff of the prime time series ALF, which had also aired on NBC from 1986 to 1990. Paul Fusco, the creator and puppeteer of ALF in the live-action series, was the only cast member to reprise his role in voice form; none of the human characters from the prime time ALF appeared in the animated series, due to the shows premise revolving around ALF (Gordon Shumway) traveling to various places on his home-world of Melmac. ALF Tales was a spin-off from the series that also ran on NBC on Saturdays from September, 1988 to December, 1989. The two ALF animated series ran concurrently during the 1988–89 season as the ALF & ALF Tales Hour.

Synopsis

Setting
This show is a prequel to the live action sitcom ALF, depicting ALF's life back on his home planet of Melmac before it exploded. Since the original character's name of "ALF" was an acronym for "Alien Life Form", it is never used in the animated series except for its title. The main character is Gordon Shumway who is normally referred to as "Gordon". In each episode, the puppet ALF from the sitcom appears at the introduction and conclusion of the episode, talking to the television viewers in the Tanner family's garage; either setting up the episode as if writing his memoirs "Melmac Memories" and commenting on it afterwards, reading fan mail or describing what his life was like on Melmac. The visual look of the series was created by the lead character designer Fil Barlow.

The format of the series has the standard setup of a situational comedy, or sitcom, as its premise, in the style of The Flintstones or The Jetsons. Much of the humor arises from the characters taking part in ordinary everyday activities set in an alien and surrealistic environment.

The Gordon/ALF from this series is one of the cartoon characters featured in Cartoon All-Stars to the Rescue.

Plot
Gordon Shumway is a fairly normal teenager living in suburban East Velcro with his parents Bob and Flo, brother Curtis, young sister Augie and their dog Neep on the planet Melmac. He spends time hanging out with his friends Rick and Skip who call him "Gordo", and he has a girlfriend named Rhonda. Sometimes, the quartet would report for mandatory duty with the Melmacian Orbit Guard. The show includes an array of quirky supporting characters, which include the fortune-smeller Madame Pokipsi and the villain Larson Petty with his offsider Eggbert.

Characters

The Shumway Family
 Gordon (Gordo) Shumway / ALF (voiced by Paul Fusco) – The star of the show.
 Bob Shumway (voiced by Thick Wilson) – Gordon's father. He works at a mayonnaise factory and is an amateur inventor.
 Flo Shumway (voiced by Peggy Mahon) – Gordon's mother.
 Curtis Shumway (voiced by Michael Fantini) – Gordon's younger brother.
 Augie Shumway (voiced by Paulina Gillis) – Gordon's little sister.
 Neep – The Shumway family's pet who looks like a dog but is officially a "vespa."
 Harry – The Shumway family's pet bird, a Westfellman Smulk.

Melmacians
 Rhonda (voiced by Paulina Gillis) – Gordon's girlfriend and secretly an accomplished pilot.
 Skipper "Skip" (voiced by Rob Cowan) – One of Gordon's close friends
 Rick Fusterman (voiced by Paul Fusco) – One of Gordon's close friends who has a persistent stutter.
 Spudder – Curtis' friend.
 Stella (voiced by Ellen-Ray Hennessy) – Waitress at the Cats Up Diner.
 Eddie – Owner of the Cats Up Diner.
 Madame Pokipsi (voiced by Deborah Theaker) – The fortune smeller.
 Colonel Cantfayl (voiced by Len Carlson) – A colonel in the Orbit Guard.
 Sargent Staff (voiced by Len Carlson) – A sergeant in the Orbit Guard.
 Freda Fusterman (voiced by Marla Lukofsky)
 Tillie (voiced by Marla Lukofsky)
 Jane Appalling (voiced by Marla Lukofsky)
 TV Announcer (voiced by Marla Lukofsky)
 Louie the Pruner - A villain and owner of a salad dressing empire. He lets tickle the feet of his victims to get informations.
 Sonny - The son of Louie the Pruner. He wanted lick salad dressing off Gordon's feet as Gordon and Albert were captured by Louie.

Villains
 Larson Petty (voiced by Thick Wilson) – The primary villain of the series. He is an unspecified alien who makes attempts to invade Melmac.
 Eggbert (voiced by Dan Hennessey) – Larson Petty's offsider.
 Sloop (voiced by Dan Hennessey) – Larson Petty's other offsider.

Episodes
Each episode is bookended by ALF talking about his upcoming book, "Melmac Memories", about his life on Melmac during his first year in the Orbit Guard.

Season 1 (1987–88)

Season 2 (1988–89)

Home media
On May 30, 2006, Lionsgate Home Entertainment released both the first nine episodes of ALF: The Animated Series as ALF Animated Adventures – 20,000 Years in Driving School and Other Stories; and the first seven episodes of ALF Tales entitled ALF and The Beanstalk and Other Classic Fairy Tales on DVD in Region 1.

Some episodes can also be found in the special features section of the collectors edition release of the original live action series.

See also

List of animated spinoffs from prime time shows

Notes

References

External links

1980s American animated television series
1980s American comic science fiction television series
1987 American television series debuts
1989 American television series endings
ALF (TV series)
American animated television spin-offs
American children's animated comic science fiction television series
American children's animated space adventure television series
American prequel television series
Animated television series about extraterrestrial life
English-language television shows
NBC original programming
Teen animated television series
Television series by DIC Entertainment
Television series by Lorimar Television
Television series by Saban Entertainment
Television series created by Paul Fusco
Television series created by Tom Patchett
Television series set on fictional planets
Television series by Lorimar-Telepictures